Astana Basketball Club, commonly referred to as BC Astana, is a Kazakh professional basketball club that is based in Astana, Kazakhstan. 

Founded in 2011, it has competed in the Kazakhstan Basketball Championship and the VTB United League since, obtaining a slew of domestic titles in the process.

History
BC Astana was created in March 2011, with the aim of competing in the VTB United League. Valery Tikhonenko was chosen as the team's general director. There were doubts expressed by other clubs in the VTB United League, about whether or not the club would be a good addition to the competition, due to the lack of basketball tradition in Kazakhstan; but the side answered all the admission requirements, including their budget, stadium (a revamped Saryarka Velodrome) and the proximity of hotels, and an international airport. The side received the totality of its funding from the Samruk-Kazyna sovereign wealth fund.

They would sign a number of Kazakhstani players from successful side Astana Tigers, also recruiting their head coach, Vitaly Strebkov, to serve as the team's assistant coach.

In their first season in the VTB United regional league, the team from Kazakhstan won 7 games out of 16 during 2011–12 regular season, including games against strong sides, such as Žalgiris and the defending title holders, Khimki, nearly reaching the playoffs. They had more success on the domestic front, winning the Kazakhstani national domestic league championship, and the Kazakhstani Cup.

The team became a part of the Astana Presidential Club multi-sports club, when it was formed in December 2012.

Arenas

BC Astana plays its home basketball games at the Saryarka Velodrome, which has a seating capacity of 10,000 people for basketball games. There is also a possibility to play games at newly built (2019) martial arts palace Zhekpe-zhek with capacity of 5000 people in the stands.

Logos

Players

Current roster

Depth chart

Season by season

Trophies and awards
Kazakhstan Basketball Championship:
Winner (10): 2012, 2013, 2014, 2015, 2017, 2018, 2019, 2020, 2021, 2022
Kazakhstan Basketball Cup: 
Winner (9): 2011, 2012, 2013, 2014, 2017, 2018, 2019, 2020, 2021
FIBA Asia Champions Cup: 
 Bronze (1): 2017

Head coaches

  Matteo Boniciolli: (2011–13)
  Aleksandar Trifunović: (2013–15)
  Ramūnas Butautas: (2015–16)
  Ilias Papatheodorou: (2016–17)
  Kostas Flevarakis: (2017–2018)
  Mikhail Karpenko: (2018)
  Emil Rajković: (2018–2021)
  Darko Ruso: (2021–2022)
  Dejan Parežanin: (2022–present)

Notable players
To appear in this section a player must have either:
- Set a club record or won an individual award as a professional player.
- Played at least one official international match for his senior national team.

 Jerry Johnson
 Rustam Murzagaliyev
 Anton Ponomarev
 Anatoliy Kolesnikov
 Jānis Blūms
 Rašid Mahalbašić
 Ivan Paunić
 Leonidas Kaselakis
 Dimitrios Katsivelis
 Dmitriy Gavrilov
 Justin Carter
 Anthony Clemmons
 Ojārs Siliņš

References and notes

External links
Official website
Eurobasket.com Team Profile

 
Astana Presidential Club
Basketball teams established in 2011
2011 establishments in Kazakhstan
Basketball teams in Astana